Centerville is an unincorporated community in Douglas County, in the U.S. state of Nevada. The community is at the intersection of Nevada routes 88 and 756 approximately two miles south-southwest of Minden.

History
Centerville was named from its central location in the surrounding valley.

References

Unincorporated communities in Douglas County, Nevada